may refer to the following:

, the Japanese word for "crimson", derived the Old Japanese , meaning "dye from China", in reference to safflower dye, introduced to Japan from China
"Kurenai" (song), a song by the metal band X Japan.
, a song by Tsuki Amano.
Kurenai Yuzuru, an actress in the all-female Takarazuka Revue.

Characters
 Kurenai Yuhi, a fictional character from the manga series Naruto.
 Tsubasa Kurenai, a fictional character from the manga series Ranma ½.
 Kurenai, the main character of the video game Red Ninja: End Of Honor.
 Kurenai, a faction of Broken Draenei in the computer game World of Warcraft.
 Maria Kurenai, a character from the manga series Vampire Knight.
 Wataru Kurenai, the main character in Kamen Rider Kiva.
 Otoya Kurenai, the father of Wataru Kurenai, in "Kamen Rider Kiva"
 Shu Kurenai, a main character from the Beyblade Burst series.

Series
 Kure-nai, a light novel series by Kentarou Katayama and the subsequent manga and anime of the same name.
 Kurenai no Buta (Porco Rosso), a film by Hayao Miyazaki produced by Studio Ghibli.
 Kurenai, the Japanese title of the manga Red Prowling Devil by Toshimitsu Shimizu.